The 1987 Jordanian  League (known as The Jordanian  League,   was the 37th season of Jordan League since its inception in 1944. Al-Wehdat under (Al-Deffatain) name won its  second title.

Teams

Map

Overview
Al-Wehdat   (Al-Deffatain) won his second   championship title .

League standings

References
RSSSF

Jordanian Pro League seasons
Jordan
Jordan
football